Brahmaea naessigi is a moth in the family Brahmaeidae. It was described by Stefan Naumann and Ulrich Brosch in 2005. It is found on Mindanao in the Philippines.

References

Brahmaeidae
Moths described in 2005